Donato Battaglia (born 1 June 1951), known simply as Dodi Battaglia, is an Italian guitarist, multi-instrumentalist and singer-songwriter known as a member of the group of the Pooh.

Born at Bologna, he joined Pooh as lead guitarist in 1968. Together with Roby Facchinetti, he was the main songwriter starting from the LP Alessandra of 1972. Battaglia was part of the Pooh until they split up in 2016. He also published several solo albums and singles and occasionally collaborated as session musician for other famous italian artists.

Discography

Solo albums
1985 – Più in alto che c'è  
1986 – Più in alto che c'è/Ciao amore buon appetito 
2003 - D' Assolo
2015 – Dov'è andata la musica (with Tommy Emmanuel)
2017 - E la storia continua
2018 - Dodi Day
2019 – Perle

With Pooh
1968 – Contrasto
1969 – Memorie
1971 – Opera prima
1972 – Alessandra
1973 – Parsifal
1975 – Un po' del nostro tempo migliore
1975 – Forse ancora poesia
1976 – Poohlover
1977 – Rotolando respirando
1978 – Boomerang
1979 – Viva
1980 – ...Stop
1981 – Buona fortuna
1983 – Tropico del nord  
1984 – Aloha
1985 – Asia non-Asia
1986 – Giorni infiniti
1987 – Il colore dei pensieri
1988 – Oasi
1990 – Uomini soli
1992 – Il cielo è blu sopra le nuvole
1994 – Musicadentro
1996 – Amici per sempre
1999 – Un posto felice
2000 – Cento di queste vite
2002 – Pinocchio
2004 – Ascolta
2008 – Beat ReGeneration
2010 – Dove comincia il sole

References

1951 births
Living people
Musicians from Bologna
Italian male singer-songwriters
Italian singer-songwriters
Italian pop singers